Moda FC is a defunct sports club of Istanbul, Ottoman Empire.

History
Moda FC was a club which was founded by Englishmen in 1903.

Honours
Istanbul Football League:
Winners: 1907–1908

League tables

Istanbul Football League:

1904–05 Istanbul Football League: 1) HMS Imogene FC 2) Moda FC 3) Cadi-Keuy FC 4) Elpis FC

1905–06 Istanbul Football League: 1) Cadi-Keuy FC 2) HMS Imogene FC 3) Moda FC 4) Elpis FC

1906–07 Istanbul Football League: 1) Cadi-Keuy FC 2) Moda FC 3) HMS Imogene FC 4) Galatasaray SK 5) Elpis FC

1907–08 Istanbul Football League: 1) Moda FC 2) Cadi-Keuy FC 3) Galatasaray SK 4) Elpis FC 5) HMS Imogene FC

1908–09 Istanbul Football League: 1) Galatasaray SK 2) Moda FC 3) HMS Imogene FC 4) Cadi-Keuy FC

1909–10 Istanbul Football League: 1) Galatasaray SK 2) Strugglers FC 3) Moda FC 4) Cadi-Keuy FC 5) Fenerbahçe SK

Matches
November 1906 Galatasaray – Moda FC: 1–1
19 January 1910 Fenerbahçe SK – Moda FC: 1–2
1910 Galatasaray – Moda FC: 2–0
1910 Galatasaray – Moda FC: 8–0
1906 Cadi-Keuy FC – Moda FC: 0–5

See also
List of Turkish Sports Clubs by Foundation Dates
 Tuncay, Bülent (2002). Galatasaray Tarihi. Yapı Kredi Yayınları 
 Dağlaroğlu, Rüştü. Fenerbahçe Spor Kulübü Tarihi 1907–1957
 Moda Futbol Kulübü. Türk Futbol Tarihi vol.1. page(22). (June 1992) Türkiye Futbol Federasyonu Yayınları.

Defunct football clubs in Turkey
Association football clubs established in 1903
Association football clubs disestablished in 1910
Sport in Kadıköy
1903 establishments in the Ottoman Empire
1910 disestablishments in the Ottoman Empire